"Who's Cheatin' Who" is a country music song written by Jerry Hayes and initially recorded by Charly McClain. It was the title track of her 1980 album for Epic Records, released in November 1980 as a single with "Love Scenes" on the B-side, and in early 1981, was her first Number One hit on the Billboard country charts. 17 years later, Alan Jackson had chart success with the song as well, with his cover version reaching number two on the same chart.

Charts

Alan Jackson version

In 1997, Alan Jackson covered the song on his album Everything I Love, releasing it as a single that year. Jackson's cover features several solos after the last chorus. Jackson also switches the song's pronouns to put it in a male's perspective. His version includes a series of extended electric guitar and piano solos before the final chorus.

Music video
The music video was directed by Brad Fuller and premiered in mid-1997 on CMT. It was filmed on location in Concord, North Carolina. Many of NASCAR's Ford drivers had a part in the video, like Rusty Wallace (who played the ending guitar solo), John Andretti, Jeremy Mayfield, Kenny Irwin Jr. (whose #98 Raybestos Ford F-150 NASCAR SuperTruck is driven at one point by Jackson in a "race", before Alan drives off the track and returns in the Bigfoot monster truck), Dale Jarrett, Mark Martin, Bill Elliott and Ernie Irvan.

Charts
"Who's Cheatin' Who" debuted at number 61 on the U.S. Billboard Hot Country Singles & Tracks for the week of April 12, 1997.

Year-end charts

See also
 List of number-one country singles of 1981 (U.S.)

References

External links

1980 singles
1997 singles
Charly McClain songs
Alan Jackson songs
Song recordings produced by Keith Stegall
Epic Records singles
Arista Nashville singles
Songs written by Jerry Hayes (songwriter)
1980 songs
Songs about infidelity